The United Nations University International Institute for Software Technology (UNU-IIST; ; Portuguese: Instituto Internacional para Tecnologia de Programação da Universidade das Nações Unidas) was a United Nations University Research Training Centre based in Macau, China.

History
During 1987–1989, United Nations University conducted two studies regarding the need for a research and training centre for computing in the developing nations. The studies led to the decision of the Council of the UNU to establish in Macau the United Nations University International Institute for Software Technology (UNU-IIST), which was founded on 12 March 1991 and opened its door in July 1992. The Macao authorities also supply the institute with its office premises, located in a heritage building Casa Silva Mendes, and subsidize fellow accommodation.

As part of the United Nations, the institute was to address the pressing global problems of human survival, development and welfare by international co-operation, research and advanced training in software technology.

Recent history during the 2000–2010 decade
UNU-IIST positions as both a university and an organ of United Nations.

Eventually, in 2015, UNU decided to evolve the former IIST into a new Institute on Computing and Society (UNU-CS).

Administration
The current director of UNU-CS is Dr. Jingbo Huang.

Former directors
 Prof. Michael L. Best (2015–2018)
 Prof. Peter Haddawy (2010–2015) 
 Prof. Mike Reed (2005–2010)
 Prof. Zhou Chaochen (1997–2002)
 Prof. Dines Bjorner (1992–1997)

Center for Electronic Governance
The Center for Electronic Governance at UNU-IIST is an International Center of Excellence on research and practice in Electronic Governance. Established in 2007, the center has been built upon the contribution of UNU-IIST to the eMacao Project (2004–2006) and eMacao Program (2007-now), a collaborative initiative to build and utilize a foundation for Electronic Government in Macao SAR. Since 2010, it has become an official programme of UNU-IIST.

The mission of the Center for Electronic Governance at UNU-IIST is to support governments in developing countries in strategic use of technology to transform the working of public organizations and their relationships with citizens, businesses, civil society, and with one another.

Activities at the Center include applied and policy research, capacity building and various forms of development – strategy development, software development, institutional development and development of communities of practice.

The Center, since July 2014, became United Nations University Operating Unit on Policy-Driven Electronic Governance (UNU-EGOV), following the appointment and relocation from Macau to Guimarães of former members of the Center.

Teaching 
The Center regularly organizes and conducts schools, seminars, lectures and presentations for government leaders, managers, researchers, educators, etc. on various aspects of Electronic Governance. Various courses and presentation materials from these events are available.

Conferences 
The center established in 2007 and since then leads the organization of a series of International Conferences on Electronic Governance (ICEGOV), with the first four editions in Macao, Cairo, Bogota, and Beijing.

See also 
 International Conference on Theory and Practice of Electronic Governance
 Prof. He Jifeng, former Senior Research Fellow

References

External links 
 UNU-IIST Website
 United Nations University (UNU)
 United Nations University Vice-Rectorate in Europe (UNU-ViE)
 United Nations University Office in Paris (UNU-OP)
 United Nations University Office in New York (UNU-ONY)
 Center for Electronic Governance at UNU-IIST
 International Conference on Theory and Practice of Electronic Governance
 Center for Electronic Governance:
 Publications
Projects:
 Developing Electronic Governance in Afghanistan – Assessment, Strategy, Implementation – EGOV.AF
 Developing Electronic Governance in Cameroon – Assessment, Strategy, Implementation – EGOV.CM
 Evaluation of Electronic Government Training by EU-China Information Society Project
 Government Enterprise Architecture Framework
 Government Information Sharing
 Knowledge Management for Electronic Governance
 Capacity Building for Electronic Governance
 IT Leadership and Coordination
Research:
 Development Models and Frameworks
 Assessment, Evaluation and Measurement
 Strategies, Architectures and Alignment
 Software Infrastructure and Services
 Knowledge Management and Leadership
 International Comparative Studies

Educational institutions established in 1992
Computer science departments
Formal methods organizations
International research institutes
Research institutes in China
Computer science institutes
United Nations organizations based in Asia
Universities in Macau
International Institute for Software Technology
1992 establishments in Macau